

Ordered by railway  track

Main Line 

The line from Colombo Fort to Badulla

Matale Line 

The line from Peradeniya Junction to Matale

Puttalam Line 

The line from Ragama Junction to Periyanagavillu

Kelani Valley Railway Line 

The line from Maradana to Avissawella

All these stations are in Colombo District of Western Province

Northern Line 

The line from Polgahawela Junction to Kankesanthurai

Mannar Line 

The line from Medawachchiya to Talaimannar

Trincomalee Line 

This line from Gal Oya to Trincomalee

Batticaloa Line 

The line from Maho Junction to Batticaloa

Coastal Line 

The line from Colombo Fort to Beliatta

See also 
List of railway stations in Sri Lanka

References

External links
Sri Lanka Railways (Official Website)
The Rail Routes of Sri Lanka

 
Sri Lanka transport-related lists